Lakin State Hospital, originally known as the Lakin State Hospital for the Colored Insane, was a publicly-funded psychiatric hospital located along West Virginia Route 62 in Lakin, Mason County, West Virginia near Point Pleasant which operated from 1926 until 1979. During segregation and Jim Crow, the asylum was designated by the State of West Virginia to care for the "colored insane". It would become one of only two known psychiatric institutions that was entirely ran by people of color serving an all black population.

References 

Defunct hospitals in West Virginia
Psychiatric hospitals in West Virginia
Buildings and structures in Mason County, West Virginia